The 1st African Youth Games took place in Rabat, Morocco's capital city from 13 to 18 July 2010. The games are targeting young African athletes, both girls and boys of 15–17 years, and about 16 sports codes will be featured at the continental event. athletics, basketball, boxing, fencing, football, gymnastics, Judo, rowing, swimming, Table Tennis, Taekwondo, Tennis, swimming and gymnastics.
The Games was organised by the ANOCA as a prelude to the 2010 Summer Youth Olympics, the first olympic youth games to be held in Singapore in August. Tunisia finished leader in the medal table standings.

Participating nations

Sports
Sixteen sports were contested in this edition of African Youth Games.

Medal table

References

2010
Multi-sport events in Morocco
2010 in multi-sport events
Youth Games
2010 in Moroccan sport
International sports competitions hosted by Morocco
2010 in youth sport